Estadio 9 de Mayo is a multi-use stadium in Machala, Ecuador.  It is currently used mostly for football matches and is the home stadium of Audaz Octubrino, Fuerza Amarilla and Orense. The stadium holds 16,500 spectators and opened in 1939.

References

9 de Mayo
Copa América stadiums
Buildings and structures in El Oro Province
Machala